Asha James (born 5 December 1999) is a Tobagonian javelin thrower, beach soccer player and a footballer who plays as a midfielder for US college team West Texas A&M Buffaloes and the Trinidad and Tobago women's national team.

Early life
James was raised in Canaan, Tobago.

International career
James represented Trinidad and Tobago at the 2016 CONCACAF Women's U-17 Championship qualification. At senior level, she capped during the 2020 CONCACAF Women's Olympic Qualifying Championship qualification.

References

External links

1999 births
Living people
People from Tobago
Trinidad and Tobago women's footballers
Women's association football midfielders
FIU Panthers women's soccer players
West Texas A&M Lady Buffs soccer players
Trinidad and Tobago women's international footballers
Beach soccer players
Trinidad and Tobago expatriate women's footballers
Trinidad and Tobago expatriate sportspeople in the United States
Expatriate women's soccer players in the United States
Trinidad and Tobago javelin throwers
Female javelin throwers
College women's track and field athletes in the United States